The Kalida Local School District is a school district in Kalida, Putnam County, Ohio.

Superintendent
Karl Lammers is the superintendent of the Kalida Local School District.

Board of education
 Board President: Gerry Vorst
 Board Vice President: Emily Peck
 Board Member: Brad Niemeyer
 Board Member: Craig Schmenk
 Board Member: Greg von der Embse

Kalida High School
Kalida High School (KHS), part of Kalida Local School District, has a strong tradition of academic, athletic, and artistic success. In 2003 they were selected as a National Blue Ribbon School of Excellence. They have also received the Ohio Department of Education Excellent rating the past 6 years. Kalida earned the highest scores on the Ohio Graduation Test out of Putnam County, besides Pandora-Gilboa which scored higher, and all of the surrounding counties. All of these accomplishments represent their high academic standards.

The current principal is Dean Brinkman.

Kalida Elementary School
The current principal is Mrs. Kayla Stechschulte.

References

External links

School districts in Ohio
Education in Putnam County, Ohio